Ommani Pawan Verma is an Indian politician, social worker, current Member of legislative assembly for Naraini constituency of Uttar Pradesh and member of Bhartiya Janata Party. She defeated the Kiran Verma of Samajwadi Party in 2022 Uttar Pradesh Legislative Assembly election by a big margin of votes. Mrs. Verma belong to the Koli caste of Uttar Pardesh.

References 

Bharatiya Janata Party politicians from Uttar Pradesh
Uttar Pradesh MLAs 2022–2027
People from Banda district, India
Women members of the Uttar Pradesh Legislative Assembly
1985 births
Living people
21st-century Indian women politicians